Alphington railway station is located on the Hurstbridge line in Victoria, Australia. It serves the north-eastern Melbourne suburb of Alphington, and opened on 8 May 1888.

History
Alphington station opened on 8 May 1888, when a railway line between Collingwood and Heidelberg was provided. Like the suburb itself, the station was named after Alphington in Devon, England, which was the birthplace of Sir William Manning, who subdivided his property in the area into a village.

In 1912, duplication between Westgarth and Alphington was provided. In 1951, duplication was provided to Ivanhoe.

In 1966, boom barriers replaced interlocked gates at the Yarralea Street level crossing, located at the down end of the station. The signal box and a goods yard were also abolished at that time.

In 1979, the current station buildings were provided.

Platforms and services
Alphington has two side platforms. It is served by Metro Trains' Hurstbridge line trains.

Platform 1:
  all stations and limited express services to Flinders Street

Platform 2:
  all stations and limited express services to Macleod, Greensborough, Eltham and Hurstbridge

Transport links
Dysons operates one bus route via Alphington station, under contract to Public Transport Victoria:
 : to Moonee Ponds Junction

References

External links

 Melway map

Railway stations in Melbourne
Railway stations in Australia opened in 1888
Railway stations in the City of Darebin